Ammanford is the name of an electoral ward to Carmarthenshire County Council, representing the community of Ammanford, Carmarthenshire, Wales.

Profile
According to the 2001 UK Census, the Ammanford ward had a population of 2,664 of whom 2,347 were born in Wales and 1,599 were able to speak Welsh.

Prior to May 2022 the Ammanford ward covered only part of the town, namely the Iscennen and Pantyffynnon town wards. The other two town wards, Myddynfych and Wernddu, formed the Pontamman county ward. Following a boundary review, the two county wards were combined, with a two-councillor representation, to take effect from the May 2022 local elections.

Representation
The Ammanford Ward was a single-member ward until May 2022 for the purposes of Carmarthenshire County Council elections. Since 2022 it has been represented by two county councillors.

Between 1989 anmd 1996 Ammanford was a county ward, including the whole of Ammanford town and neighbouring Betws, electing one councillor to Dyfed County Council.

Election history
The first election to the new unitary Carmarthenshire County Council took place in 1995. Meinir Thomas, who had represented the ward on the former Dinefwr Borough Council was elected by a small majority over the Labour candidate.

 

Boundary changes in 1999 saw the Ammanford ward merged with the Pantyffynnon ward to create a new ward which was named Ammanford. The two sitting councillors opposed each other and Michael Hugh Evans, who previously represented Pantyffynnon, defeated Meinir Thomas.

 

Evans faced opposition from Plaid Cymru in 2004 but comfortably retained the seat.

 

In 2008, Evans's majority was significantly reduced a Plaid Cymru opponent.

 

Evans stood down at the 2012 and his successor as Labour candidate was defeated by Plaid Cymru.

Earlier History

County Council Elections
Ammanford first became an electoral ward in the early twentieth century, having initially been part of the Betws ward at the formation of Carmarthenshire County Council. In due course two wards were created at Ammanford for county council elections and these continued to exist until Carmarthenshire was abolished in 1974.

With the formation of Dyfed County Council, Ammanford continued to elect two councillors until the wards were merged in 1989.

When the current Carmarthenshire County Council was formed in 1995, an Ammanford ward based on the boundaries for elections similar to those in existence between 1889 and 1974 was re-established.

District Council Elections
From 1973 until 1996, Ammanford formed an electoral ward for the purposes of elections to Dinefwr Borough Council.

References

Carmarthenshire electoral wards
electoral ward
Wards of Dyfed